Matthew James Vogel (born October 6, 1970) is an American puppeteer, actor and director. Vogel has worked for Sesame Workshop and The Muppets Studio. He has performed for the Muppets, Sesame Street, and Oobi. He has been the performer of Kermit the Frog since 2017 and the full-time performer of Big Bird since 2018.

Career
Vogel first auditioned for the Jim Henson Company in 1993 and joined the crew of Sesame Street in 1996 as an ensemble puppeteer. He has served as a director and puppet captain on Sesame Street since 2008. He inherited many of Jerry Nelson's Muppet character roles in 2008, when he began performing with The Muppets Studio. Since 2017, he has been the performer of Kermit the Frog.

With the Muppets, Vogel is one of the principal cast performers with the roles of Kermit, Floyd Pepper, Uncle Deadly, Lew Zealand, Crazy Harry, Robin the Frog (until 2017 when Peter Linz took over to allow Kermit and Robin to still be in scenes together), Sweetums, Camilla the Chicken, Dr. Julius Strangepork, Pops, '80s Robot and Constantine under his tutelage. On Sesame Street, Vogel is the performer of Big Bird, Count von Count and Mr. Johnson as well as Biff, Herb the Dinosaur, Hansel, Forgetful Jones, Sherlock Hemlock and one of the Yip-Yip Martians. He also performs Alex, a Muppet whose father is in jail, for the Sesame Street in Communities initiative page on incarceration. On Oobi, he performed Angus.

Beginning his puppeteering career at the Jim Henson Company in the 1990s, Vogel later served as the assistant puppeteer for Ernie on Sesame Street, performing with Steve Whitmire. After studying the role of Big Bird under the performance of Caroll Spinney since 1996, he inherited the role in 2015, explaining "It takes a lot of physical exertion" and "I'm wearing the body of the bird". Spinney remarked that "Vogel" is the German translation for "bird". He also took over the puppetry of the Sesame Street character Count von Count, and also the voice after Nelson died in 2012.

With The Muppets Studio, Vogel has been performing since 2008, and has appeared in The Muppets, Muppets Most Wanted, and a short-lived primetime series. Vogel performed the Muppets that were used in Kenneth's view of the world in the 30 Rock episode "Apollo, Apollo". In 2016, Vogel voiced the character, Wilkins in Alice Through the Looking Glass directed by James Bobin.

From 2017 onward, Vogel was cast as the new performer for Kermit the Frog, replacing Whitmire. His first official performance as Kermit was a "Muppets Thought of the Week" segment uploaded on the Muppets' official YouTube channel in August 2017.

In 2021, Vogel performed Kermit the Frog when he competed on season five of The Masked Singer as "Snail" and was the first to be eliminated.

Personal life
Vogel is originally from Kansas City, Kansas. He was a fan of both Sesame Street and The Muppet Show as a boy. Vogel interned at Messner Puppet Theater in his home town where he played his first role of Victor Frankenstein in Paul Mesner Puppets’ “Frankenstein” in 1993. After 1993, he moved from Kansas City to New York. Vogel has been married to his wife Kelly C. McDonnell since August 31, 1997; together they have five children.

Filmography

Other appearances

See also
List of Sesame Street puppeteers
List of Muppets

References

External links
 Official site
 

1970 births
Living people
Muppet performers
People from Kansas City, Kansas
Sesame Street Muppeteers